Aleksandr Aleksandrovich Plotnikov (born 17 February 1979) is a former Russian professional footballer.

External links
 
 

1979 births
Sportspeople from Rostov-on-Don
Living people
Russian footballers
Association football goalkeepers
FC Rostov players
FC Olimpia Volgograd players
FC Darida Minsk Raion players
FC Dynamo Brest players
FC Zhemchuzhina Sochi players
FC Chernomorets Novorossiysk players
FC Yenisey Krasnoyarsk players
Belarusian Premier League players
Russian expatriate footballers
Expatriate footballers in Belarus